Monarch Ski and Snowboard Area is a ski resort located in the state of Colorado. It is twenty miles (32 km) west of Salida, Colorado, on U.S. Highway 50. The resort is situated on Monarch Pass at the continental divide. It has 54 trails, two terrain parks, and an extreme terrain area called Mirkwood.  The Monarch Mountain Lodge is located three miles (5 km) east of the ski area in the town of Garfield, Colorado. 

Monarch is open daily from 9:00 a.m. to 4:00 p.m. from mid-November to early April.

Monarch Ski Area is named after Monarch Pass and the associated Monarch Mountain.  Monarch pass and Monarch Mountain themselves are named after the 19th-century town Monarch, which was razed by the CDOT to make way for US Route 50.

History

Monarch first opened in 1939, with one rope tow running up the run named Gunbarrel: a long, steep, heavily-moguled run on the south side of the area.  The tow rope was powered by a Chevy engine when it was first opened.

Monarch has been owned and sold many times and is currently owned by many separate parties, none owning more than 25%.

Ski School

A Sprung building was built in 2007 to be the new home for the ski school and rental shop.  The ski school offers lessons for all ages and abilities in all three disciplines (ski, snowboard, and telemark).  All equipment needed for the three disciplines are available for rental on-site.  The rental shop also has tune-ups and waxing.

Terrain parks

The run formerly known as Slo-Motion was developed into the K2 terrain park in 2008. It is composed of all-natural features, including logs, stumps, and jumps. The run can be used by anyone, even if they have no intent of using any of the features. It is next known as the Never Summer terrain park.  As of 2021 it is now known as Steel City. 

There is a small park at the base of the panorama double chairlift called Tilt.

Snow Cat 
Monarch Cat Skiing offers 1,635 acres of diverse expert terrain featuring wide open bowls, steep chutes, beautiful glades and tree skiing.

External links
 Ski Monarch
 Monarch's History

Ski areas and resorts in Colorado
Buildings and structures in Chaffee County, Colorado
Tourist attractions in Chaffee County, Colorado